Generally people in interactive, brainstorming groups produce fewer ideas and ones that are less creative than those same people would if they were working individually, in what is known as nominal groups. Production blocking, the tendency for one individual during a group discussion to block or inhibit other people from offering ideas, is a major reason.

For example, if one person in a six-person group is talking about his or her idea, then the other five people are "blocked" and less able to provide their own creative input. Additionally, production blocking can occur if the same six people are attempting to communicate their ideas at the same time as one another.

When others are talking, group members may not have time to think of an idea, might get distracted, or merely forget about their idea before they have an opportunity to share it.  Production block is not the same as either evaluation apprehension or social loafing, two other factors that can cause people to produce fewer ideas in real, interactive groups  than those in nominal groups.  With evaluation apprehension, individuals may be reluctant to share their suggestions, fearing that they may be negatively criticized. With social loafing, they may not share ideas because they believe other group members will do so instead.

Methods to decrease the production blocking problem
 Writing down thoughts: Taking notes is recommended when group members in brainstorming groups are waiting for their chance to speak. When communication is not available, writing down ones thoughts would be helpful to prevent productivity loss. Although the note taking method reduces the production blocking problem, a study has shown that it does not increase the quantity of ideas produced.
 Nominal Groups: Reviews of research on brainstorming groups and nominal groups suggest that nominal groups surpass brainstorming groups. Unlike traditional brainstorming groups, nominal groups consist of a body of individuals whose ideas can be shared without any interaction with others. Individuals in nominal groups do not have to wait to share their thoughts, thus, their ideas will not be forgotten or lost. Another factor to consider is that in brainstorming groups, individuals may end up having conversations about a different subject with other members. This can be a significant factor that can lead to the production blocking problem because group members are not contributing to the quality of the groups product. Additionally, using nominal groups would generate a larger number of ideas in a restricted time frame compared to traditional brainstorming groups.
 Brain storming online: Instead of physically interacting with other members of a brainstorming group,  electric brainstorming consists of communication via a computer. Like nominal groups, members of electric brainstorming groups do not have to worry about waiting their turn to speak. Ideas are also shared anonymously, therefore, group members do not have to feel resistant to share their unique thoughts with others. Furthermore, the ideas that group members come up with would not be lost considering that they will be recorded.
 Increased Competition: When rewards are introduced for ideas, whether for larger individual contribution or credit for one's own ideas, overall group production increases. Group members are more self-focused and likely to share their thoughts regardless of what others may have already said.

References 

Group problem solving methods